William Bortrick  (born April 1973) is a British genealogist who is the owner, chairman and editor of Burke's Peerage.

He studied history at the University of Oxford, and Wolfson College, Cambridge.

In September 2021, Prince Charles's closest aide Michael Fawcett "stepped down temporarily" as chief executive of The Prince's Foundation, after an investigation by The Sunday Times and the Mail on Sunday reported that he "offered to help to secure a knighthood and British citizenship" for a Saudi tycoon, who donated £1.5m to Prince Charles's charities. Bortrick was named by the Sunday Times as the alleged fixer at the heart of the claims. Bortrick is said to have received thousands of pounds to secure the honour. According to the Metropolitan Police, at least two complaints were made calling for an investigation into whether Prince Charles or Michael Fawcett breached the Honours (Prevention of Abuses) Act 1925. In February 2022 the Metropolitan Police launched an investigation into the cash-for-honours allegations linked to Charles' charity The Prince's Foundation.

References

1973 births
Living people
Alumni of the University of Oxford
Alumni of Wolfson College, Cambridge
British genealogists